Thermonectus is a genus of beetle in family Dytiscidae. This genus is native to the New World, and mainly from warm temperate to tropical in distribution, but one species, T. basillaris occurs as far north as southern Ontario, Canada. They inhabit a wide range of freshwater habitats with static water and are often common.

Species

Thermonectus contains the following 20 species:

 Thermonectus alfredi Griffini, 1898
 Thermonectus basillaris (Harris, 1829)
 Thermonectus batesi Sharp, 1882
 Thermonectus circumscriptus (Latreille, 1809)
 Thermonectus cuneatus Sharp, 1882
 Thermonectus depictus Sharp, 1882
 Thermonectus duponti (Aubé, 1838)
 Thermonectus intermedius Crotch, 1873
 Thermonectus laporti (Aubé, 1838)
 Thermonectus leprieuri J. Balfour-Browne, 1944
 Thermonectus margineguttatus (Aubé, 1838)
 Thermonectus marmoratus (Gray, 1831)
 Thermonectus nigrofasciatus (Aubé, 1838)
 Thermonectus nobilis Zimmermann, 1924
 Thermonectus sibleyi Goodhue-McWilliams, 1981
 Thermonectus simulator Sharp, 1882
 Thermonectus succinctus (Aubé, 1838)
 Thermonectus tremouillesi Michat & Torres, 2016
 Thermonectus variegatus (Laporte, 1835)
 Thermonectus zimmermani Goodhue-McWilliams, 1981

References

External links
Thermonectus at BugGuide.Net

Dytiscidae